The 1971 Rose Bowl was It was the 57th edition of the college football bowl game, played at the Rose Bowl in Pasadena, California, on Friday, January 1. The Stanford Indians of the Pacific-8 Conference defeated the second-ranked Ohio State Buckeyes of the Big Ten Conference,  The Player of the Game was Stanford quarterback  the Heisman Trophy winner.

Teams

Ohio State

Ohio State started the season ranked first in the nation and proceeded to roll off five easy wins by a combined score of 195–60. In their fifth game, the Buckeyes won 48–29 at Illinois. But for some reason, Texas leapfrogged Ohio State to #1 after beating unranked Rice 45–21. The next week the Buckeyes defeated #20 Northwestern 24–10, but dropped to third in the rankings as Notre Dame moved up to second after a rout of Navy.

After a 10–7 win with a late field goal at Purdue on November 14, they fell to fifth despite still being undefeated, as Nebraska and Michigan passed them.  They earned the Rose Bowl berth on the strength of their 20–9 victory over #4 Michigan in their rivalry game that decided the Big Ten title and rose back to second, behind Texas. After Texas lost in the Cotton Bowl to #6 Notre Dame earlier on New Year's Day, Ohio State went into the Rose Bowl with the inside track to claim the national championship.

Stanford

Stanford started the season ranked tenth, and in the season opener they upset #4 Arkansas  at Little Rock. After an easy win over San Jose State, they traveled north to Eugene for a game that featured a quarterback battle between Plunkett and Oregon sophomore Dan Fouts. Stanford won  but then were caught looking ahead to their showdown with USC and lost  at home to Purdue. They then beat four-time defending Pac-8 champion USC at Stanford,  (avenging a last second loss to the Trojans the year before). An easy  over conference doormat Washington State boosted the Indians to #8.

Next up was a showdown with #16 UCLA in Los Angeles for the conference lead. In what was expected to be another quarterback showdown between Plunkett and the Bruins' Dennis Dummit, the defenses dominated in Stanford's key   After an easy win over Oregon State, they rose to sixth before clinching the conference title in the Rose Bowl decider over sophomore QB Sonny Sixkiller and Washington,  Stanford then suffered a pair of letdowns, losing to #13 Air Force  and to arch rival California,  The Pac-8 standings were so tightly bunched, that a win by either Oregon, UCLA, or Washington over Stanford would have sent that team to the Rose Bowl.

Scoring

First quarter
 Stanford – Jackie Brown 4-yard run (Steve Horowitz kick), 10:20
 Stanford – Horowitz 37-yard field goal, 6:50
 Ohio State – John Brockington 1-yard run (Fred Schram kick), 3:45

Second quarter
 Ohio State – Brockington 1-yard run (Schram kick), 14:24

Third quarter
 Stanford – Horowitz 48-yard field goal, 12:29
 Ohio State – Schram 32-yard field goal, 8:33

Fourth quarter
 Stanford – Brown 1-yard run (Horowitz kick), 10:03
 Stanford – Randy Vataha 10-yard pass from Jim Plunkett (Horowitz kick), 8:18

Statistics
{| class=wikitable style="text-align:center"
! Statistics !!   Stanford   !! Ohio State
|-
|align=left|First downs	||21||22
|-
|align=left|Rushes–yards||37–143||67–364
|-
|align=left|Passing yards||265	||75
|-
|align=left|Passes||20–30–1||7–20–1
|-
|align=left|Total yards	||408||439
|- 
|align=left|Punts–average||3–33||2–28
|- 
|align=left|Fumbles–lost ||3–2	||2–0
|-
|align=left|Turnovers by ||3||1
|-
|align=left|Yards penalized||3–46||6–68
|}

Aftermath
Earlier that New Year's Day, top-ranked Texas lost  to #6 Notre Dame in the Cotton Bowl  Stanford's upset prevented Ohio State from claiming the national championship, which went to  a 17–12 victor over  that night in the Orange Bowl   taken after the bowls, Ohio State fell to fifth and Stanford rose   Stanford repeated as Rose Bowl champions the following year, led by fifth-year senior quarterback Don Bunce, who redshirted this season.

Notes
 Plunkett is Stanford’s only Heisman Trophy winner, and is the only player to be named MVP of the Rose Bowl and  he was the first overall pick of the 1971 NFL Draft.

References

Rose Bowl
Rose Bowl Game
Ohio State Buckeyes football bowl games
Stanford Cardinal football bowl games
Rose Bowl
January 1971 sports events in the United States